The Central District League First Division was the third-tier division of the West Region of the Scottish Junior Football Association. The two highest-placed teams at the end of the season were promoted to the Super League, First Division. The three lowest-placed teams were relegated to Central District Second Division.

It sat below region-wide division and alongside an 'Ayrshire' geographical equivalent (with one division), representing the Ayrshire League and Central League which merged to form the West Region.

In 2018, the lower leagues in the West Region were reorganised, no longer being split geographically, with the result that the Central First and Second Divisions and the Ayrshire Division merged and were separated into two tiers (League One and League Two).

Member clubs for the 2016–17 season
 
1 Groundsharing with Petershill

Season summaries

References

External links
West Region Central Division One at Non-League Scotland (archive version, 2007-08 membership)

3
2002 establishments in Scotland
2018 disestablishments in Scotland
Sports leagues established in 2002
Sports leagues disestablished in 2018